Thicker Than Water is a 2000 documentary surf film directed by singer/songwriter Jack Johnson and his film school friend Chris Malloy. It shows surfing footage from different locations like Australia, Indonesia, Hawaii, India, and Ireland in combination with a wide range of styles of guitar music. Surfers in the film include Kelly Slater and Shane Dorian.

Cast
In alphabetical order:
Raimana Boucher
Saxon Boucher
Timmy Curran
Shane Dorian
Brad Gerlach
Conan Hayes
Jack Johnson
Noah Johnson
Taylor Knox
Rob Machado
Chris Malloy
Dan Malloy
Emmett Malloy
Keith Malloy
Kelly Slater
Benji Weatherly

Soundtrack
Released on November 25, 2003, the soundtrack to Thicker Than Water, which is scored by Johnson, collects 14 tracks by the likes of G. Love & Special Sauce, The Meters, Finley Quaye, and Johnson himself.

Track listing
 "Moonshine" – 2:00 (Jack Johnson)
 "Rainbow" – 3:23 (Jack Johnson)
 "Even After All" – 3:55 (Finley Quaye)
 "Hobo Blues" – 2:44 (G. Love)
 "Relate to Me" – 1:34 (The Voyces)
 "The Cove" – 1:52 (Jack Johnson)
 "Holes to Heaven" – 2:49 (Jack Johnson)
 "Dark Water & Stars" – 4:59 (Natural Calamity)
 "My Guru" – 4:10 (Kalyanji–Anandji)
 "Honor and Harmony" – 3:36 (G. Love and Special Sauce)
 "Liver Splash" – 2:38 (The Meters)
 "Underwater Love" – 5:58 (Smoke City)
 "Thicker than Water" – 3:25 (Todd Hannigan)
 "Witchi Tai To" – 2:43 (Harpers Bizarre)

Awards and honors
Thicker than Water received Surfer magazine's 2000 Video of the Year Award.

Certifications

References

External links
 

2000 films
2000 documentary films
American sports documentary films
Documentary films about surfing
2000 directorial debut films
American surfing films
Films shot in Australia
Films shot in Indonesia
Films shot in Hawaii
Films shot in Ireland
Films shot in India
2000s English-language films
2000s American films